On 5 July 2012, WikiLeaks began publishing what it called the Syria Files, a collection of more than two million emails from Syrian political figures and ministries and from companies including Finmeccanica and Brown Lloyd James dating from August 2006 to March 2012.

Release 
The release of the files began on 5 July 2012. The database comprises 2,434,899 emails from 680 domains. At least 400,000 files are in Arabic and 68,000 files in Russian. Media organisations working with WikiLeaks on the release include the Lebanese daily Al Akhbar, the Egyptian daily Al-Masry Al-Youm, the Italian weekly L'espresso, the German public radio and television broadcaster Norddeutscher Rundfunk (NDR) of the ARD consortium, the French information website OWNI and the Spanish website Público. The Associated Press (AP) news agency was initially announced by WikiLeaks to be helping with the release. The claim was withdrawn by WikiLeaks and an AP spokesperson stated that AP was "reviewing the emails for possible coverage [and] did not have any advance agreement on how [it] might handle the material." According to Al Akhbars analysis, the Syria Files "illuminate—often in small ways—the nature of power within and the inner workings of certain political and economic elements in Syria". Al Akhbar states its confidence that "the emails are authentic, that the senders and receivers are mainly who they say they are".

Data retrieval 
In the weeks following the Syria Files' release in July 2012, a hacktivist group of the Anonymous collective claimed credit for obtaining the emails and providing them to WikiLeaks. Anonymous stated that it had "worked day and night" in order to access computer servers in Syria and that "the data available had been so massive that downloading it had taken several weeks." Anonymous gave the data to WikiLeaks because it judged WikiLeaks to be "supremely well equipped to handle a disclosure of this magnitude". Anonymous stated that as long as Bashar al-Assad remains in power, it will continue "to assist the courageous freedom fighters and activists in Syria".

In 2016, an interview between a member of the hacktivist group RevoluSec and Al Jazeera English and 500 pages of United States sealed court records viewed by The Daily Dot gave credit to RevoluSec, whose membership overlaps with Anonymous, for the data retrieval and for its transmission to WikiLeaks. RevoluSec claimed to have had complete access to all Syrian internet routers and switches, including those of the Syrian Computer Society's SCS-Net. RevoluSec described the aims of its project as exposing censorship and human rights abuses and supporting Syrians' human rights. RevoluSec's attacks against the Syrian government lasted for about a year.

Cases

Finmeccanica
According to emails published by WikiLeaks on 5 July 2012, the Italian conglomerate Finmeccanica increased its sale of mobile communications equipment to Syrian authorities during 2011, delivering 500 of these to the Damascus suburb Muadamia in May 2011, after the Syrian Civil War had started, and sending engineers to Damascus in February 2012 to provide training in using the communications equipment in helicopter terminals, while the conflict continued.

Brown Lloyd James
In May 2011, the public relations firm Brown Lloyd James sent an email to Syrian authorities "on how to create the appearance it is pursuing reform while repressing the uprising", in Ynetnews' description of an email published by WikiLeaks on 6 July 2012. Brown Lloyd James advised that "Refocusing the perception of outsiders and Syrians on reform will provide political cover to the generally sympathetic US Government, and will delegitimize critics at home and abroad. In our view, the President needs to communicate more often and with more finely-tuned messaging and the First Lady needs to get in the game. The absence of a public figure as popular, capable, and attuned to the hopes of the people as Her Excellency at such a critical moment is conspicuous. The key is to show strength and sympathy at once." The company recommended a public relations campaign to "create a reform 'echo-chamber' by developing media coverage outside of Syria that points to the President's difficult task of wanting reform" so that the "coverage [would] rebound into Syria". Brown Lloyd James also recommended "countering ... the daily torrent of criticism and lies" by "[a] 24-hour media monitoring and response system [that] should be in place with assets in UK and US markets; [monitoring] social media sites and [challenging and removing] false sites; and a steady, constantly updated messaging document that contains talking points geared to latest developments."

Brown Lloyd James stated that the document was not paid for, was a "'last-ditch' effort 'to encourage a peaceful outcome rather than violence', and that it was sent to Asma al-Assad, the wife of President Bashar al-Assad.

Bashar and Asma al-Assad
On 8 July 2012, Al Akhbar presented an analysis of emails by President Bashar al-Assad and his wife Asma al-Assad. Al Akhbar listed the main topics of the al-Assad's Syria Files emails, and stated, "Viewed through the prism of the 'Syria Files', Syria’s first couple appear to be occupied with their representative capacities, with ample time devoted to the state of the palatial gardens, renovations, the stationary needs of low-level employees, but also issues related to bolstering the couple’s image, be it via charitable efforts or through political favors. During the first year of the uprising covered by the emails in the cache, the official and unofficial correspondence of the First Couple and ministry of presidential affairs present only few references to the ongoing tumult .... But there is no real sense of tangible power on behalf of the First Couple present within the 'Syria Files.' What is revealed is only a façade, or perhaps fittingly, a brand calculated to cloak another system: the military-security machine, which remains as of yet tightly in control and far from prying eyes."

Rami Makhlouf
Syria Files examined by Al Akhbar show that after businessman Rami Makhlouf publicly claimed to respond to protestors' demands by "repenting" from business, selling shares and investing his money and time in charity and development projects, he continued to invest in several banks during 2011 and 2012. In late January 2012, he bought about 15 times as much shares (by value) as he sold, buying  and selling  of shares, mostly in Qatar National Bank–Syria and Syria International Islamic Bank.

Commentary and reactions
WikiLeaks leader Julian Assange said of the files that "it helps us not merely to criticise one group or another, but to understand their interests, actions and thoughts. It is only through understanding this conflict that we can hope to resolve it."

Omitted documents
On 9 September 2016, reporters from The Daily Dot, using information from sealed US court documents, stated that the leaked version of the Syria Files omitted records of a  transfer from the Central Bank of Syria to the Russian government-owned VTB Bank. The reporters were skeptical about the omission being a coincidence. Wikileaks stated that it published all of the Syria files that it had obtained.

References

External links
The Syria Files
Syria Files press conference
Project Tetratac Syria (Confidential dossier of Selex_Finmeccanica)

2012 in international relations
2012 scandals
Email hacking
Politics of Syria
Information published by WikiLeaks
Syrian civil war
News leaks
Data breaches
July 2012 events in Syria